Christen Heiberg (28 November 1799 – 18 March 1872) was a Norwegian surgeon and professor.

Biography
Heiberg was born in Bergen, Norway. He was the son of Christopher Heiberg (1767–1811) and Margrethe Heide Fritzner (1772–1816).  
He attended Bergen Cathedral School graduating in 1817. He studied at the Royal Frederick University (now University of Oslo) from which he graduated  in 1822. He followed with a study trip to Copenhagen from  1823-24.

He was physician at Rikshospitalet from 1826. His thesis from 1830 was a treatment of eye surgery.  After further study  in Germany and Paris during 1835, he was appointed professor at the  University of Christiania from 1836.
He was decorated Knight of the Order of St. Olav in 1853, and Commander in 1866. He was a Knight of the Swedish Order of the Polar Star.

in 1825, he married Johanne Marie Wilhelmine Alida Heiberg (1803–1869). They were the parents of professor Hjalmar Heiberg and grandparents of artist Jean Heiberg.

References

1799 births
1872 deaths
Physicians from Bergen
University of Oslo alumni
Norwegian surgeons
19th-century Norwegian physicians
Academic staff of the University of Oslo
Knights of the Order of the Polar Star
Recipients of the St. Olav's Medal